Vinayak Pandurang Karmarkar (विनायक पांडुरंग करमरकर)  (1891–1967), popularly known as Nanasaheb Karmarkar was an Indian artist, famous for his sculptures.
 He is best known for his statues of Chhatrapati Shivaji Maharaj.
 Karmarkar Museum of Sculpture has been set up at his house in Sasawane village near Alibag. Located 18 kms from on Alibaug-Rewas Road,  Maharashtra, India, is a museum where sculptors made by Late Mr. Nanasaheb Karmarkar are displayed in his own bungalow.  There about 150 beautifully carved sculptures displayed here.

Early life 

His father was a farmer and a bit inclined to music. Vinayak used to carve Ganesh idols during Ganesh festival.  Vinayak who used to paint his house walls and make small idols from clay. He was fond of making sculptures right from his childhood. He once made a painting of Chatarapati Shivaji Maharaj on a horse on the walls of the Ram Mandir, which was well appreciated by the Villagers and the District Collector Mr. Otto Rothfield, who later enrolled him in the Sir Jamsetjee Jeejebhoy School of Art in Mumbai. He topped the exams and was awarded ‘Lord Mayo’ Medal. The most famous among his other sculptures are 'Shankha-Dhwani', 'Matsya-Kanya' and 'Humjoli'. His style was realistic

Awards and honours 

1964 - awarded Padma Shri by the Government of India.

1964 - awarded Fellowship by Delhi Lalit Kala Academy

References

External links 

 Short film from the DD Sahyadri archives on YouTube (in Marathi)

1891 births
1967 deaths
Indian male sculptors
20th-century Indian sculptors
Fellows of the Lalit Kala Akademi
People from Raigad district
Recipients of the Padma Shri in arts
20th-century Indian male artists